Rab' Dhalma is a sub-district located in Hubaysh District, Ibb Governorate, Yemen. Rab' Dhalma had a population of 8977 according to the 2004 census.

References 

Sub-districts in Hubaysh District